This is a list of Russian federal subjects by GDP per capita by purchasing power parity (PPP) and Nominal GDP.

Note: The list does not include the Republic of Crimea and the Special City of Sevastopol.

See also
 List of Russian federal subjects by GRP
 List of Russian federal subjects by average wage

References

Russia, GDP
GDP
Russian federal subjects
GDP